The Davenport Blue Sox was the name given to three minor league baseball teams based in Davenport, Iowa. The first version of the Blue Sox played in the Class B Three-I League from 1913–1916. The second played in the Class D Mississippi Valley League from 1929–1933, and the third version played in the Western League from 1934–1937. From 1936–1937, the team was a minor league affiliate of the Brooklyn Dodgers. The Blue Sox played their home games at Municipal Stadium from 1931–1937 and were the foundation for today's tenant, the Quad Cities River Bandits.

The 1933 club has been rated as the 58th best minor league baseball team of all time.

Year-by-year record

References

This article is based on the "Davenport Blue Sox" article at Baseball-Reference.com Bullpen. The Bullpen is a wiki, and its content is available under the GNU Free Documentation License.

Brooklyn Dodgers minor league affiliates
Defunct minor league baseball teams
Defunct baseball teams in Iowa
Illinois-Indiana-Iowa League teams
Sports teams in the Quad Cities
Baseball teams established in 1901
1901 establishments in Iowa
Davenport, Iowa
1937 disestablishments in Iowa
Baseball teams disestablished in 1937
Defunct Western League teams
Mississippi Valley League teams